Brandon is a Latin freestyle-pop artist born and raised in San Jose, California.

Lead vocalist Brandon Michaels, dancers, Peter Gabel, and Joe Gabel who all hailed from San Jose California  topped the charts in the early 1990s.  In 1991, the band had a hit with the gold single, "Kisses in the Night," background vocals by Charlie Pennachio, and Wyatt Pauley "guitar" from Linear.  In 1990, Linear had a hit with the gold single, "Sending All My Love," which was released on Atlantic Records and hit number 5 on the Billboard Hot 100.  Kisses in the Night was released on Alpha/Polygram Records in 1991 and hit number 49 on the Billboard Hot 100.  Billboard Hot 100 magazine wrote for the week of May 11, 1991  The only new artist among the seven debuts beside Paula Abdul Rush Rush, is Brandon whose first HOT 100 single, Kisses In The Night, "Alpha/Polygram" is breaking out of Philadelphia (16-12 at Q102) Honolulu (27-17 at KIKI) and his home town of San Jose, California, (22-16 at HOT 97.7).  Brandon  also released on the Alpha Intl Records  a dance underground hit single "DESTINY,".

In 1992, Brandon was signed to Polygram Records.
Brandon and the group traveled all over the USA promoting their Top 100 billboard hit single Kisses in the Night.  DESTINY, dance single entered the national pop charts in the 1991 U.S.  Polygram Records caught wind of the single and tracked Brandon down, and soon signed Brandon to a recording contract. "Kisses in the Night" soared into the U.S. Mainstream and top Billboard Hot 100 (49) and earned RIAA Gold certification. Brandon, Peter and Joe performed on the USA TV channel on  DANCE PARTY USA.  USA Teenage show called YOUTH QUAKE also followed Brandon in the 1991 on his promotional tour.  Brandon was featured in “Hitmakers magazine” “Teen magazines”, “Top 100 Billboard” Televisions “Entertainment tonight”, “USA Youth Quake” and “Dance party USA”

References

External links 
http://www.allmusic.com/album/masters-of-freestyle-vol-4-r683628

American freestyle musicians
Musicians from California